The study of geography in China begins in the Warring States period (5th century BC). It expands its scope beyond the Chinese homeland with the growth of the Chinese Empire under the Han dynasty and enters a golden age with the Han dynasty invention of the compass as one of the Four Great Inventions. The compass was then used from the 11th century during the Song dynasty, Yuan dynasty, Ming dynasty, and Qing dynasty in the study of geography. One of the most famous explorers in Chinese history was the 15th century admiral Zheng He, known for the Chinese exploration of the Pacific and his treasure voyages.

Highlights
Warring States
Seven Qin State maps dated to the 4th century BC are found in Gansu province in 1986
Crown Prince Dan and Jing Ke's assassination plot against Qin Shi Huang in 227 BC, first reference to a map drawn on silk.
Han
Mawangdui Han tombs site reveals three maps drawn on silk, dated to the 2nd century BC, found in 1973
Shiji by Sima Qian, which included a wealth of geographical material thanks to the travels of Zhang Qian in Central Asia
Book of Han
Rites of Zhou
 Liu An (2nd century BC), Huainanzi
Yuejue Shu, the first gazetteer in China, written in 52 CE.
Three Kingdoms
Pei Xiu (3rd century), the "father of Chinese cartography" produced a map of China with plotted grid lines and a graduated scale.
Yu Huan, wrote the Weilüe (preserved in the Records of the Three Kingdoms), including information on countries as far away as West Asia and the eastern provinces of the Roman Empire
Liu Song dynasty
 Fan Ye (historian) wrote the Book of Later Han; contains information on countries as far as West Asia, including Daqin, the Roman Empire
Tang
Bianji (7th century), Great Tang Records on the Western Regions
Jia Dan (8th century)
Duan Chengshi (9th century)
Song
Su Song (11th century)
Shen Kuo (11th century)
Fan Chengda (12th century)
Yuan
Chen Yuanjing (13th century), Shilin Guangji
Zhou Daguan (13th century)
Wang Dayuan (14th century)
Yu Qin (14th century)
Ming
Zheng He (15th century)
Xu Xiake (17th century)
Matteo Ricci and Xu Guangqi (17th century)
Giulio Aleni (1623)
Martino Martini (1655)
Qing
 Dushi Fangyu Jiyao

Early survivals

Maps showing areas beyond China survive from the Song dynasty (960-1279). A map carved in stone in AD 1137 shows 500 settlements and a dozen rivers in China, and includes large parts of Korea and Vietnam. On the reverse, the Yu Ji Tu (see picture), a copy of a more ancient map, uses the grid system developed in China a millennium earlier.

Maps of the Yuan dynasty
The expansion of Chinese geographical enterprise to a world scale originates from a historical setting of the Mongol Empire, which connected the western Islamic world with the Chinese sphere, enabling both trade and the exchange of information.

After the founding of the Yuan dynasty in 1271, Kublai Khan ordered the compilation of a geography monograph named Dayuan Dayitong Zhi (大元大一統志) (extant manuscripts lack maps) in 1285. In 1286, Persian astronomer Jamāl al-Dīn made Kublai Khan (who had brought him east to undertake co-operative research with Chinese scholars in the 1260s) a proposal for merging several maps of the empire into a single world map, and it resulted in the Tianxia Dili Zongtu (天下地理總圖). It was supposedly a world map but is lost today. He also ordered to obtain a book called Rāh-nāmah (road book) from Muslim sailors. An extant map attached to the Jingshi Dadian (經世大典; 1329–1333) proves Mongols' accurate knowledge on Inner Asia that was obtained from Muslims. Influences by these official projects, Taoist monk Zhu Siben (朱思本) compiled a geography monograph of China named Jiuyu Zhi (九域志) in 1297. Based on this earlier work, he created a now lost map of China named Yuditu (與地圖) in 1311-1320.

However, these materials were too large for circulation. What directly impacted Chinese intellectuals were other compilations. In the first half of the 14th century, encyclopedias such as the Hanmo Quanshu (翰墨全書) and the Zhishun edition of the Shilin Guangji (事林廣記), written by Chen Yuanjing (陈元靓), updated their geographic knowledge from the preceding Jurchen Jin and Southern Song Dynasties to the contemporary Mongol-ruled Yuan dynasty.

Newly discovered materials reveal personal networks among intellectuals of southern China, centered in Qingyuan (Ningbo). Qingjun, who was from neighboring Taizhou, created the Hunyi Jiangli Tu when he stayed in Qingyuan. Wu Sidao, who left an important bibliographic clue, was also from Qingyuan. In addition, Ningbo was one of the most important seaports and the sea routes were extended to Fuzhou and Guangzhou, and Southeast Asia, Japan and Goryeo. They must have acquired marine information from Muslim sailors.

Maps in the Chinese tradition tended to be known by specific titles, easily expressed as short sequences of ideograms, such as the Yu Gong Jiuzhou Lidai Diwang Guodu Dili Tu (禹貢九州歷代帝王國都地理圖; Map of Capitals of Historical Emperors and Kings in the Nine Provinces described in theYu Gong).

Shengjiao Guangbei Tu
The Shengjiao Guangbei Tu ("map of the resounding teaching (of the khan) prevailing all over the world") by Li Zemin is lost. Its original state can be deduced by examining its derivative works: the Guangyutu (廣與圖) (1555) by Luo Hongxian (羅洪先) contains a pair of maps named Dongnan Haiyi Tu (東南海夷圖) and Xinan Haiyi Tu (西南海夷圖) that are considered to be the southern half of the Shengjiao Guangbei Tu although Luo's copy dropped most place names except for coastal areas and islands. The Da Ming Hun Yi Tu (大明混一圖/Dai Ming gurun-i uherilehe nirugan), a Ming period map with much later Manchu translations of its labels, is also considered to have been based ultimately on Li Zemin's map.

The Shengjiao Guangbei Tu was a world map. It contained not only China but also Africa and Europe. Luo's copy and the Daming Hunyi Tu suggest that the original depicted India more accurately than the Korean adaptation although it is also possible that the Daming Hunyi Tu reflects 17th century knowledge.

Little is known about the author Li Zemin. Based on place names on the map, it has been presumed that it was created around 1319 and revised sometime between 1329 and 1338. However, Wu Sidao's statement (described later) suggests that his map was newer than Qingjun's (1360?).

Guanglun Jiangli Tu
The Hunyi Jiangli Tu by Zen monk Qingjun (1328–1392) is lost. However, the Shuidong Riji (水東日記) by the Ming period book collector Ye Sheng (葉盛) (1420–1474) includes a modified edition of the map by the name of Guanglun Jiangli Tu (廣輪疆理圖). Ye Sheng also recorded Yan Jie (嚴節)'s colophon to the map (1452). According to Yan Jie, the Guanglun Jiangli Tu was created in 1360. The extant map was modified, probably by Yan Jie, to catch up with contemporary Ming place names. The original map covered place names of the Mongol-ruled Yuan dynasty.

The Guanglun Jiangli Tu was one of historical maps that were popular among Chinese intellectuals. It showed historical capitals of Chinese dynasties in addition to contemporary place names. It followed Chinese tradition in that it was a map of China, not the world. But contrary to Song period maps which reflected limited Chinese knowledge on geography, it incorporated information on Mongolia and Southeast Asia. It also provided information of sea routes (there remain traces on the Honmyōji map).

Wu Sidao's work
Contemporary to Qingjun, Wu Sidao (烏斯道), author of Chuncaozhai Ji (春草齋集), merged the Guanglun Tu (廣輪圖) and Li Rulin (李汝霖)'s Shengjiao Beihua Tu (聲教被化圖) although his map is not known today. The Guanglun Tu must refer to Qingjun's Guanglun Jiangli Tu. It may be that Rulin was Li Zemin's courtesy name and the Shengjiao Beihua Tu was an alias for the Shengjiao Guangbei Tu.

Late maps in the Chinese tradition

In 1579, Luo Hongxian published the Guang Yutu atlas, including more than 40 maps, a grid system, and a systematic way of representing major landmarks such as mountains, rivers, roads and borders. The Guang Yutu incorporates the discoveries of naval explorer Zheng He's 15th century voyages along the coasts of China, Southeast Asia, India and Africa.

From the 16th and 17th centuries, several examples survive of maps focused on cultural information. Gridlines are not used on either Yu Shi's Gujin xingsheng zhi tu (1555) or Zhang Huang's Tushu bian (1613); instead, illustrations and annotations show mythical places, exotic foreign peoples, administrative changes and the deeds of historic and legendary heroes.

See also

1421 hypothesis
Chinese exploration
Geography of China
History of cartography
History of geography
Kangnido
Muslim geography

References

 
History of geography